Shellshock is a video game developed by Core Design and published by U.S. Gold for Sega Saturn, PlayStation and MS-DOS, first released in 1996.

Gameplay
Shellshock is a near-future game in which the player character is a new recruit as part of a tank commando corps that work as mercenaries.

Release
A 3DO Interactive Multiplayer version was announced to be in development but it never released.

Reception

Next Generation reviewed the PlayStation version of the game, rating it four stars out of five, and stated that "for those with the determination and patience, Shellshock has its rewards."

Next Generation reviewed the Saturn version of the game, rating it three stars out of five, and stated that "Combine the simplistic but entertaining gameplay with 25 extremely challenging levels and there is plenty here for the gamer who doesn't mind foregoing a little realism for fun."

Next Generation reviewed the PC version of the game, rating it two stars out of five, and stated that "on the pure action level, this might whet some appetites. It's not a hit, but it might be enough to entertain you as long as it's purchased in the ever-helpful bargain bin."

Mark Clarkson from Computer Gaming World gave the game 3 stars out 5, saying while "Shellshock doesn't set any new standards, it is fun and loud. Your M-13 rips through chain-link fences and snaps street lights like twigs, all while thumping music blares in the background. And best of all, in a LAN-based multiplayer game you can hurl both shells and taunts a your real-life homies."

Reviews
PC Gamer Vol. 3 No. 6 (1996 June)
GameFan #43 (Vol 4, Issue 7)  1996 July
Computer Games Magazine (1996)
NowGamer - Oct 25, 1996
Video Games & Computer Entertainment - Jun, 1996
GameFan Magazine - Jun, 1996
Jeuxvideo.com - Feb 24, 2012

Notes

References

External links
 Shellshock at GameFAQs
 Shellshock at Giant Bomb
 Shellshock at MobyGames
Review in PC World

1996 video games
Cancelled 3DO Interactive Multiplayer games
DOS games
PlayStation (console) games
Sega Saturn games
Tank simulation video games
Video games developed in the United Kingdom